"Lady D'Arbanville" is a song written and recorded by Cat Stevens and released in April 1970. It subsequently appeared on his third album, Mona Bone Jakon, released later that year. It was his first single released after signing a contract with Island Records, with the encouragement of his new producer, Paul Samwell-Smith, fostering a folk rock direction. "Lady D'Arbanville" has a madrigal sound, and was written about Stevens' former girlfriend, Patti D'Arbanville, metaphorically laying her to rest.

Background
"Lady D'Arbanville" was the first single released from Mona Bone Jakon, which took off in a completely different direction from the songs of his previous two albums. Although Stevens' debut album had charted, and while both albums he had recorded had successful single releases in the British pop music charts, he chafed against the "Carnaby Street musical jangle" and "heavy-handed orchestration" that his producer, Mike Hurst (of Deram Records) favoured. Just at the completion of his second album with Hurst, Stevens contracted tuberculosis and a collapsed lung, requiring hospitalisation and rest for a year. During this time, he spent his empty hours writing more than 40 songs, and upon a clean bill of health successfully negotiated out of his Deram contract, and settled on Island Records' Paul Samwell-Smith as his new producer, who encouraged Stevens' inclinations towards an emerging folk rock genre.

As Stevens was nearing the end of his period of recuperation, he attended a party that boasted a gathering of musicians in London including Jimmy Page, Steve Winwood, Ginger Baker, Eric Clapton and others. Among the party-goers was Patti D'Arbanville, a US teenager who was pursuing a modelling career and later gained prominence as an actress. The two began dating. D'Arbanville stayed with him whenever she was in London, but often found her career taking her to Paris, and New York City. After over a year together, Stevens was ready to invest in a more serious relationship than was his young, ambitious girlfriend. It was on a foray to New York that she heard his song about her on the airwaves. Her reaction was one of sadness. She said, 

D'Arbanville continues,

Musical genre and sound
While Stevens' previous singles featured orchestration, this was the first single to contain only acoustic guitars, bass,  organ, percussion, and vocals. Newly hired Alun Davies, initially brought in as a session guitarist, shared Stevens' love for the newly emerging folk rock sound that Stevens chose to pursue. The two guitarists worked with John Ryan's syncopated basslines and drummer Harvey Burns' latin rhythms were used to emphasize the beat of the song on the body of the guitar. Stevens said of it later, that "the name itself was intriguing", and that "it was one of the unique songs that stood out, even lyrically". The song had a unique arrangement, and melody as well. A backing vocal chorus in the style of Spaghetti Western classics added intrigue. The song had enough commercial appeal to reach No.8 on the British pop music chart, and became the first Stevens' track to get noticeable airplay in the United States. "Lady D'Arbanville" was issued in June 1970 and became his third top ten hit in the UK, with the album  Mona Bone Jakon, beginning a modest climb up the charts as well.

Charts
Song

Personnel
Cat Stevens – guitar, keyboards, vocals
Alun Davies – guitar, backing vocals
John Ryan  – double bass
Harvey Burns – percussion

Other versions
Elton John also performed a version of "Lady D'Arbanville" for a covers record, at a time in his career when he was still in relative obscurity. However, in parts of the song, he substitutes the word fille (French for girl which Cat Stevens pronounces like fill). The original song is written thus: 
"My Lady D'Arbanville, why do you sleep so still?
I'll wake you tomorrow, and you will be my fille, 
Yes, you will be my fille
Elton John's version has him singing "You will be my pill", instead of the original lyrics. John's career took off around the same time as that of Stevens, and the cover songs that John sang on, including "Lady D'Arbanville", remained in obscurity until they were eventually released on a compilation album titled Chartbusters Go Pop in 1994.

In 1970, the song was recorded in both French and Italian by French-Italian Singer Dalida and released on singles in France and Italy. Italian singer Gigliola Cinquetti also recorded the song in Italian the same year.

English band And Also the Trees also performed the song on their 1989 album Farewell to the Shade.

References 

1970 singles
1970 songs
A&M Records singles
Cat Stevens songs
Island Records singles
Song recordings produced by Paul Samwell-Smith
Songs about entertainers
Songs written by Cat Stevens